Alberto Díaz Gutiérrez, better known as Alberto Korda or simply Korda (September 14, 1928 – May 25, 2001), was a Cuban photographer, remembered for his famous image Guerrillero Heroico of Argentine Marxist revolutionary Che Guevara.

Early life
Korda, whose real name was Alberto Díaz Gutiérrez, was born on September 14, 1928, in Havana, Cuba. He got his first taste of photography when he took his father's Kodak 35mm and began taking pictures of his girlfriend. Korda was the son of a railway worker, and took many jobs before beginning as a photographer's assistant. Korda began his career as a photographer who shot pictures at banquets, baptisms and weddings. He would run back to his studio to develop the film, then return to the event and sell his photographs as souvenirs. The quality of Korda's work as a beginner was very poor; after a few months the image became blurry and the paper yellowed. When he opened his first studio, Korda had an opportunity to learn from his mistakes and to stop the yellowing process by using the right chemicals for the correct durations of time. In 1953, Korda opened his first studio with a photographer named Luis Pierce. Initially, Korda and Pierce took a variety of jobs ranging from fashion to advertisements.

Most of the jobs were photographed by his studio partner, to keep their business going. It was the money generated by these jobs that allowed Korda to develop his unique style of looking at an image from another angle, different from the traditional photographers’ studios. It was this style that Studios Korda quickly became identified with achieving. In the early years, Korda was most interested in fashion because it allowed him to pursue his two favorite things, photography and beautiful women. Korda became Cuba's premiere fashion photographer.

Korda disliked artificial lighting; he said it was "a travesty of reality" and only used natural light in his studio. He was master of black-and-white photography who looked for perfect composition and framing. Korda had unique creative ambition that he used to rise above in style when compared to the unimaginative cultural perspective of traditional Cuban photography. This unique creativity turned the Korda Studio into something more than just a prosperous business; it became an art studio. "My main aim was to meet women", he once confessed. His second wife, Natalia (Norka) Menendez, was a well known Cuban fashion model.

Cuban Revolution
The relationship between Fidel Castro and Korda could not be defined by one label or title. For Castro, Korda was more than an official photographer, a friend or personal photographer. They never discussed salary or title, their relationship wasn't boss and worker. Korda was very relaxed, and interested in everything and everyone. Every photo he took was a symbol of the revolution, instead of a documentary of the events of the revolution. The Cuban Revolution was the turning point in Korda's career; his career plans were completely changed with the success of the revolutionaries. In 1959 the newly established newspaper offered the largest space for photographers to display their photographs, and Korda became part of the revolutionary cause. Korda Says, "Nearing 30, I was heading toward a frivolous life when an exceptional event transformed my life: The Cuban Revolution. It was at this time that I took this photo of a little girl, who was clutching a piece of wood for a doll. I came to understand that it was worth dedicating my work to a revolution which aimed to remove these inequalities.” He got caught up in the ideals of the revolution and began photographing its leaders. As photographer of the Revolution, Korda always worked at his own photographic tempo; he wasn't pushed by the press or by any other requests. Wherever the revolution took Castro, Korda followed. One of Korda's most recognizable images was of Castro's visit to the Lincoln Memorial in Washington, D.C., in April 1959. Castro's travels took Korda all around Cuba, overseas, and the Soviet Union. In 1963 photos of Fidel and Nikita Khrushchev, taken by Korda, illustrated the differences in both men that were evident in their respective politics.

In 1959 Fidel went back to the Sierra Maestra, the remote mountain region, where the revolutionary army began its attacks on the army of the Batista Regime. Korda's style was to move to the front of whatever group Fidel was leading to get the shots he wanted. When Korda came back to his home, his daughter barely recognized him: his hair and beard were long and he hadn't showered for months. Korda took many pictures for the newspaper and called the series "Fidel Returns to the Sierra." Fidel always liked Korda's photos and never stopped him when he attempted to take his picture. He worked freely without thinking about political consequences to get what he wanted in his photos.

Korda was a photographer for the Cuban newspaper Revolución when he produced on March 5, 1960, the iconic image of Che Guevara that became a worldwide symbol of revolution and rebellion. He never received any royalties for the image, because Castro did not recognize the Berne Convention for the Protection of Literary and Artistic Works. In 2000, he sued Smirnoff (Lowe Lintas) over the use of the image in advertisement. Commenting on the illicit use of his photograph, the artist said, "As a supporter of the ideals for which Che Guevara died, I am not averse to its reproduction by those who wish to propagate his memory and the cause of social justice throughout the world, but I am categorically against the exploitation of Che's image for the promotion of products such as alcohol, or for any purpose that denigrates the reputation of Che." His out-of-court settlement of US $50,000 was donated to the Cuban healthcare system. He said, "If Che were still alive, he would have done the same." However, he told a BBC World Service reporter that he did approve of the 1999 Che Jesus adaptation of the image used by the Churches Advertising Network to promote church attendance in the UK. The truth is that Korda gave the picture for free to Giangiacomo Feltrinelli, an Italian publisher who had published Doctor Zhivago and went on to publish Castro's diaries.

After the revolution, Korda became Fidel Castro's personal photographer for 10 years, accompanying Castro on trips and in meetings with foreign personalities. During this time he also took pictures of demonstrations, sugar cane harvests and factory scenes. Other less-known Fidel Castro images by Korda include shots of Castro staring warily at a tiger in a New York zoo, playing golf and fishing with Che Guevara, skiing and hunting in Russia, and with Ernest Hemingway. Korda's work also includes pictures of Castro's rebels riding into Havana after their triumph, and one known as The Quixote of the Lamp Post showing a Cuban wearing a straw hat and sitting on a lamp post against a sea of people during a rally.

Later life and death
From 1968 to 1978 he concentrated on underwater photography until a Japanese exhibition in 1978 stimulated international interest in his work. He appeared briefly in the pre-title sequence of Wim Wenders' film Buena Vista Social Club in 1999, although he was uncredited.

Korda suffered a fatal heart attack in Paris in 2001 while presenting an exhibition of his work.  He is buried in the Colon Cemetery, Havana.

He was featured in a full feature documentary titled Kordavision directed by Hector Cruz Sandoval in 2006 which was selected by AMPAS 2007 documentary series.

In September 2016 the 'Leica' camera that Korda's used for his famous photo of Che Guevara was auctioned through the online auction house Catawiki for 18,100 euros.

Korda's Family lawsuit against Bruce Labruce's The Raspberry Reich

In 2005 Bruce Labruce's producer Jürgen Brüning and Labruce himself were sued by the estate of Korda for a million dollars over the use of Korda's famous photo of Che "Guerrillero Heroico" in Labruce's movie The Raspberry Reich.

In an interview from 2018 the Canadian filmmaker talked about the lawsuit:

It played at over a hundred film festivals and was on its way to becoming a cult hit when, about six months into my tour with the film, Jurgen and I got hit with a million dollar (Canadian) lawsuit for copyright infringement by the Korda estate.

The lawsuit was launched in France, which has some of the toughest copyright laws in the world, but the sixty-page court document was delivered to my door in Toronto by a local sheriff, so it was pretty heavy. We got a famous gay French lawyer, Emmanuel Pierrat, to defend us, but we technically lost. The damages were reduced to about €8,000, but we had to cover the court costs, so we ended up having to pay about €30,000 (the budget of the film was about 60,000!), effectively erasing all our profits from the film.

'The film is a critique of radical chic and both a critique and celebration of the radical left, but it is obviously anti-capitalist, so the irony of being scuttled by Che and Korda over copyright was bitter.

They argued mostly that we “demeaned” and “defiled” the image of Che, although I didn’t really intend having a hot porn star jerk off on a blow-up of the Che image to be demeaning at all – more of an homage, really. I just figured everyone else in the world was jerking off to the image, so I might as well show it literally.

The film’s slogans, particularly “The Revolution is My Boyfriend,” started to be widely quoted online and on t-shirts and banners, neatly mirroring the radical chic critiqued in the movie.

Excerpt from Make Porn, Not War: An Interview With Bruce LaBruce.

Notable photos by Korda
 La Niña de la Muñeca de Palo (1958)
 Entrada de Fidel a La Habana (1959)
 El Quijote de la farola (1959)
 Fidel in Washington (1959)
 Guerrillero Heroico (1960)
 Miliciana (1962)

Exhibitions

Solo exhibitions of his works have been held in Helsinki, Finland, 1962; the Galleria H. Diafragma Canon, Milan, Italy, 1985; Galería Servando Cabrera, Havana, 1986; Roy Boyd Gallery, Chicago, 2000; COEX, Seoul, Korea, 2011.

Group exhibitions of his works include: in 1962, Museo Nacional de Bellas Artes, Havana; 1967, Expo’67, Pabellón Cubano, Montreal; 1980, Consejo Mexicano de Fotografía, Mexico City; 1980, Centro de Arte Internacional, Havana; 1983, Westbeth Gallery, New York; 1999, Centro de Desarrollo de las Artes Visuales, Havana; 2000, C. Grimaldis Gallery, Baltimore, Maryland; 2000, Royal National Theatre, London; 2002, Museum of Art, Ft. Lauderdale, Florida.

Awards
He was awarded the Cuban "Palma de Plata" in 1959; named Best Photoreporter of the year, Revolución Journal, Havana, 1960–1963; awarded the 5th International Award of Submarine Photografie "Maurizio Sana," Italy; awarded National Culture Distinction, Ministry of Culture, Cuba; 1994.

Collections
His works are in the collections of Casa de las Américas, Havana, Cuba; Center for Cuban Studies, New York, NY; Centro Studi e Archivio della Comunicazione, Parma University, Parma, Italy; Fototeca de Cuba, Havana, Cuba; Galleria IF, Milan, Italy; Galleria Il Diafragma Kodak, Milan, Italy; Maison de la Culture de la Seine Saint-Denis, Paris, France; Museo Nacional de Bellas Artes, Havana, Cuba.

References

External links

Alberto Korda, by Bill Lasarow
BBC: News report on Korda's death
BBC: "Guevara's Image Saved from Drink", September 15, 2000
Frontline: 
Guerrillero Heroico – A discussion on Korda's best-known photograph
The story of Korda's Che Guevara Image
Korda's Che Guevara Image. Che Guevara aniverary in "La Patria Grande Caracas
 Sun Sentinel: Exhibit: "Korda, Known. Unknown" now in Havana November 10, 2008
Washington Post: Cuba by Korda – Photo Collection
 History of a portrait Articles on Alberto Korda picture of Che, taken March 5, 1960
 Korda Photos of Fidel Castro and Che Guevara – slideshow by BBC News
 Photos of early days of Cuban Revolution by Alerto Korda

1928 births
2001 deaths
Che Guevara
Cuban photographers
Cuban communists
Underwater photographers
Portrait photographers
Artists from Havana